3 Medical Regiment, was a unit of the British Army's Royal Army Medical Corps.

History 
3 Medical Regiment was formed in 2000 following the 1998 Strategic Defence Review. The Regiment was formed from 3 squadrons: A (12) Medical Squadron, B (16) Medical Squadron, and C (24) Medical Squadron. Following their formation, the Regiment was assigned to the 3rd (United Kingdom) Mechanised Division and based at Gaza Barracks. In 2002, the Regiment was renamed as 3 Close Support Medical Regiment.

Over the next 10 years, from 2003 to 2013, the Regiment saw multiple deployments to Iraq (OP Telic) and Afghanistan (OP Herrick).

In 2010, as a  result of the Army 2020 reforms, the Regiment was moved under operational control of the 102nd Logistics Brigade but supporting 3 UK Division.

In 2015, as a result of the Army 2020 Refine reforms, it was announced that Headquarters, 102nd Logistic Brigade was to be rationalised and all its reporting units moved under other commands. The Regiment will be re-equipped with the Mechanised Infantry Vehicle and will see a reduction of 3 personnel.

Structure 
 Regimental Headquarters, Fulwood Barracks, Preston
 12 Medical Squadron, Fulwood Barracks, Preston
 29 Medical Squadron, Fulwood Barracks, Preston
 18 Support Squadron, Fulwood Barracks, Preston

References

External links 

3 Medical Regiment 

Units of the Royal Army Medical Corps
Military units and formations established in 2000